The Mykola Lysenko Music Competition, named after Mykola Lysenko, was founded in 1962 by the Ukrainian composers Andriy Shtoharenko, Yevhen Stankovych, Myroslav Skoryk, Levko Kolodub, the singer Yelyzaveta Chavdar, pianists Yevhen Rzhanov and the composer's granddaughter Ariadna Lysenko. In 1992, on the 150th anniversary of Lysenko's birth, it acquired international status.

Most Prestigious
Over years of its existence it has become one of the most important and prestigious music forums in Ukraine. Until 1992, it was a national music competition "Ukrainian Young Artists Competition", held in various cities of Ukraine: Kyiv, Kharkiv, Lviv, Odessa, and Zaporizhia. Winners’ Concert was held at Pyotr Tchaikovsky National Music Academy of Ukraine. One of the notable winners at that period in 1966 and 1970 was pianist Sophia Agranovich. Since 1992 it has been run as the Mykola Lysenko International Music Competition.

At different times the competition jury panel was adorned by the names of Ukraine's finest artists and professors, as well as distinguished musicians from Russia, Poland, Canada, Austria, Germany, Latvia, Armenia, Estonia, Belarus, Rumania, Kazakhstan, Italy, the USA etc.

The competition repertoire of each participant must include works of classic repertoire as well as works by Lysenko and other Ukrainian composers. Thus every time these academic tournaments turn into a brilliant music festival with bright national colour.

Starts
Thanks to the Lysenko Competition a powerful start in career was given to a number of Ukrainian artists, known worldwide: pianists – Liudmyla Martsevych, Etella Tchupryk, Milana Tcherniavska; violinists Oleksandr Semchuk, Olha Rivniak, and Dima Tkachenko; cellists Hanna Nuzha, Ivan Kucher; singers Lidia Zabiliasta, Andrii Shkurhan, Volodymyr Hryshko, Mykola Shopsha and many others.

The Lysenko Competition is not just another music tournament with joyful victories and upset losses intermingled but it is above all a forum of masters of various generations, exchange of experience and masterclass of skillful performance.

The Mykola Lysenko Music Competition is a visiting-card of the Ukrainian music culture and is among the well-known leading competitions in Eastern Europe such as The Tchaikovsky Competition in Russia, Chopin Competition in Poland and several others.

The Mykola Lysenko International Music Competition (1992)

JURY MEMBERS

Piano nomination:

Violin nomination (Kharkiv):

Cello nomination (Kyiv): Natalia Khoma (Ukraine),

Singing nomination (Odessa):

COMPETITION RESULTS:

Piano nomination: A.Kutasevych (Ukraine),

Violin nomination (Kharkiv): I prize – Oleksandr Semchuk, (Ukraine);

Cello nomination (Kyiv): I prize – A. Nuzha (Ukraine); II prize – І. Kucher (Ukraine);

Singing nomination (Odessa): 
In female group: I prize and Grand Prix – Tetiana Anisimova (Ukraine);
Grand Prix – Pryimak Petro (Ukraine), III prize – Pryimak Pavlo (Ukraine);
Special Prizes "To the best accompanist" – Galyna Radchenko.

The I Mykola Lysenko International Music Competition (19 November – 6 December 1997)

JURY MEMBERS

Piano nomination: Jury Chairman – Mykhailo Stepanenko (Ukraine), Ariadna Lysenko (Ukraine), Ethella Chupryk (Ukraine), Yuriy Ayrapetian (Russia), Jaroslaw Drzewiecki (Poland), Igor Koch (Austria), Luba Zuk (Canada).

Violin nomination: Simon Camartin (Switzerland), Dyusen Kaseinov (Kazakhstan), Michael Striharz (Germany), Igor Frolov (Russia).

Cello nomination: Medeia Abramian (Armenia), Wang Xiang (China), Maris Villerush (Latvia), Jerzy Wujtewicz (Poland), Yulia Panteliat (Austria), Serhiy Usanov (Russia).

Singing nomination: Lyudmyla Kolos (Belarus), Vasile Martinoiu (Romania), Mati Palm (Estonia) and Branislav Jatych (Yugoslavia).

COMPETITION RESULTS:

Piano nomination: І prize – Inna Soldatenko (Ukraine); ІІ prize – Alina Chalikova.

Violin nomination: І prize – Dmytro Tkachenko (Ukraine); ІІ prize – Ostap Shutko (Ukraine).

Cello nomination: І prize – not given; ІІ prize (ex-aequo) – Diana Havata / Kateryna Danylenko.

Singing nomination:
In female group: Grand Prix – Liudmyla Monastyrska; І prize – Liudmyla Povstenko; ІІ prize – Zhanna Nimenska.

In male group: І prize – Stanislav Tryfonov; ІІ prize – Mykhailo Kirishev.

The II Mykola Lysenko International Music Competition (November – December 2002)

JURY MEMBERS

Piano nomination:

Violin nomination:

Cello nomination: J.Laniuk (Ukraina),

Singing nomination:

COMPETITION RESULTS:

Piano nomination: I prize – U Tsun (China);

Violin nomination: I prize – Anastasia Pylatiuk (Ukraine); II prize – Kyrylo Sharapov (Ukraine); III prize – Lidiya Futorska (Ukraine).

Cello nomination: I prize – Hanna Pyrozhkova (Ukraine);

Singing nomination:
In female group: I prize –  (Oksana Dyka);
In male group: III prize – Kovnir Sergiy (Ukraine)

The III Mykola Lysenko International Music Competition (27 November – 8 December 2007)

JURY MEMBERS

Piano nomination: Jury Chairman – Myroslav Skoryk (Ukraine); Yuri Hildiuk (Belarus); Bronislava Kavallia (Poland); Maryna Kryh (Ukraine); Rada Lysenko (Ukraine); Olena Rikhter (Russia); Vitaly Samoshko (Belgium); Volodymyr Vynnytsky (USA); Liuba Zhuk (Canada).

Violin nomination: Jury Chairman – Bogodar Kotorovych (Ukraine); Anatoliy Bazhenov (Ukraine); Rodney Friend (UK); Dyusen Kaseinov (Kazakhstan); Bohdan Kaskiv (Ukraine); David Takeno (Japan); Dima Tkachenko (Ukraine/UK); Valery Vorona (Russia); Krzysztof Wegrzyn (Germany/Poland).

Cello nomination: Jury Chairman – Yuri Laniuk (Ukraine); Andrzej Bauer (Poland); Marcel Bergman (Israel); Gert von Bulow (Germany); Simon Camartin (Switzerland); Harytyna Kolesa (Ukraine); Natalia Khoma (USA); Ivan Kucher (Ukraine); Florian Leonhard (UK).

Singing nomination: Jury Chairwoman – Yevdokia Kolesnyk (Ukraine); Charlotte Lehmann (Germany); Sergej Martinov (Latvia); Mihail Munteanu (Moldova); Petro Onchul (Ukraine); Galyna Polyvanova (Ukraine); Natalia Rudneva (Belarus); Petro Skusnichenko (Russia); Enrico Stinchelli (Italy).

COMPETITION RESULTS:

Piano nomination: І prize – Dmytro Onyschenko (Ukraine); ІІ prize – Katerynа Kulykova (Ukraine); ІІІ prize – Alexei Chernov (Russia); IV prize – Andriy Dragan (Ukraine); V prize – Tetiana Shafran (Ukraine); Special Prize "For the best performance of a piece by Mykola Lysenko" – Katerynа Kulykova (Ukraine).

Violin nomination: І prize – Solenne Paidassi (France); ІІ prize – Nazariy Pylatiuk (Ukraine); ІІІ prize – Maksym Hrinchenko (Ukraine) and Taras Yaropud (Ukraine); Special Prize "For the best performance of a piece by Mykola Lysenko" – Solenne Paidassi (France); Special Prizes "To the best accompanist" – Kateryna Lebedeva and Svitlana Smykovska.

Cello nomination: І prize – Ruodi Li (China); ІІ prize – Bartosz Koziak (Poland); ІІІ prize – Artem Shmahaylo (Ukraine); IV prize -Maksym Dedikov (Ukraine); V prize – Alexei Shestiperov (Russia); Special Prize "For the best performance of a piece by Mykola Lysenko" – Alexei Shestiperov (Russia); Special Prizes "To the best accompanist" – Olga Cherniak and Jozsef Erminy.

Singing nomination:
In female group: І prize – Anna Viktorova (Russia); ІІ prize – Valentyna Andreeva (Ukraine ) and Katerina Vasilenko (Russia); ІІІ prize – Melanie Horner (Germany), Yulia Lytvynova (Ukraine) and Natalia Pavlenko (Ukraine); IV prize – Zoya Ivaniuk (Ukraine) and Hu Jing (China); V prize – Elena Demirjian (Moldova).

In male group: І prize – Yuri Horyn (Ukraine); ІІ prize – Yevhen Orlov (Ukraine); ІІІ prize – Dmytro Kuzmin (Ukraine); IV prize – Igor Turkan (Moldova); V prize – Zhu Lu (China); Special Prize "For the best performance of a piece by Mykola Lysenko" – Oleksandr Kireev (Ukraine) and Olga Fomichova (Ukraine); Special Prizes "To the best accompanist" – Marina Belousova (Russia,) Viktoria Mramornova (Ukraine), Margaryta Serhienko (Ukraine) and Olga Filatova (Ukraine)

The IV Mykola Lysenko International Music Competition (15–24 November 2012)

Jury Members

List of prizewinners

Special Prize  «For the best performance of a piece by Mykola Lysenko»

Special Prize – «To the best competition accompanist»

Special Awards

A violin bow by the violin maker Ihor Gontar: Mengchan Zhao

A cello bow by the violin maker Ihor Gontar: Yaroslava Trofymchuk 

Recital engagement offered at the Festival “Harmonie Starego Miasta” (The Wieniawski Music Society in Lublin): Oleksandr Korniev, Orest Smovzh, Rustam Muradov

Recital engagement offered at the Lviv Philharmonic Hall: Paulina Kusa

Solo recital engagement offered from Mikrokosmos Society in Ravenna (Italy): Rustam Muradov

Concert engagements from XXVI Kos-Anatolsky Ukrainian music festival: Oleksandr Korniev, Valentyn Valentiev, Artem Poludenny

Links
 Official website
 The 2nd Mykola Lysenko International Music Competition
  The 3rd Mykola Lysenko International Music Competition

References 

Competitions in Ukraine
Violin competitions
Piano competitions
Singing competitions
Classical music awards
Music competitions